Les Pins tram stop  is a tram stop on line A of the Tramway de Bordeaux. It is operated by Transports Bordeaux Métropole.

For most of the day on Mondays to Fridays, trams run at least every ten minutes to and from central Bordeaux. Services run less frequently in the early morning, late evenings, weekends and public holidays.

The tram stop has twin tracks served by a pair of side platforms. Just to the west of the stop the two tracks converge to a single track, which threads its way through the complex grade-separated intersection between the Avenue de Magudas and the ring road until it reaches the line's terminus at Le Haillan Rostand.

References 

Bordeaux tramway stops
Tram stops in Mérignac
Railway stations in France opened in 2007